Georg Lagerstedt (23 September 1892 – 24 November 1982) was a Swedish painter. His work was part of the art competitions at the 1932 Summer Olympics and the 1936 Summer Olympics.

References

1892 births
1982 deaths
20th-century Swedish painters
Swedish male painters
Olympic competitors in art competitions
People from Ljungby Municipality
20th-century Swedish male artists